Admilson Estaline Dias de Barros (born 24 February 1988), known as Gegé, is a Cape Verdean professional footballer who plays as a central defender.

He spent the vast majority of his professional career in Portugal, starting out at Estrela da Amadora.

Club career
Gegé was born in Praia. He moved to Portugal in 2008, starting in the lower leagues with S.C. Pombal and C.F. Estrela da Amadora and moving to the second division in June 2010, signing for C.D. Trofense.

After one more season in the second level, with S.C. Covilhã, Gegé moved to the Primeira Liga with C.S. Marítimo, initially being assigned to the reserves in division three. He made his debut in Portugal's top flight with the Madeirans on 18 August 2013, coming on as a late substitute in a 2–1 home win against S.L. Benfica.

Gegé signed a two-year contract with F.C. Arouca on 27 August 2015. During his spell, he played 44 competitive games and scored three goals, two of those coming in the 2016–17 edition of the UEFA Europa League, against Heracles Almelo (1–1 away draw, qualification on the away goals rule) and Olympiacos FC (2–1 loss in Athens after extra time).

On 31 January 2017, Gegé joined F.C. Paços de Ferreira also of the top tier. He made his league debut three days later, in a 2–0 home victory over Vitória de Guimarães.

In the 2017 off-season, Gegé moved to the Saudi Professional League with Al-Fayha FC.

International career
Gegé was called up to the Cape Verde national team for friendlies against Malta and Angola in September 2009, along three other under-21 internationals, but eventually did not play. He earned his first full cap the following year, featuring the full 90 minutes in a 2–1 defeat of Guinea-Bissau in Lisbon.

Gegé scored his first international goal on 31 March 2015, contributing to a 2–0 friendly victory in Portugal and being replaced at half-time. He was a participant at the 2013 and 2015 Africa Cup of Nations, contributing respectively two and three appearances as the nation exited in the quarter-finals and the group stage.

Career statistics

Club

International

International goals
 (Cape Verde score listed first, score column indicates score after each Gegé goal)

|-
| 1. || 31 March 2015 || António Coimbra da Mota, Estoril, Portugal ||  ||  ||  || Friendly ||
|-
| 2. || 28 March 2017 || Alphonse Theis, Hesperange, Luxembourg ||  ||  ||  || Friendly || 
|}

References

External links

1988 births
Living people
People from Praia
Cape Verdean footballers
Association football defenders
Boavista FC (Cape Verde) players
Primeira Liga players
Liga Portugal 2 players
Segunda Divisão players
S.C. Pombal players
C.F. Estrela da Amadora players
C.D. Trofense players
S.C. Covilhã players
C.S. Marítimo players
F.C. Arouca players
F.C. Paços de Ferreira players
Saudi Professional League players
Al-Fayha FC players
Cape Verde international footballers
2013 Africa Cup of Nations players
2015 Africa Cup of Nations players
Cape Verdean expatriate footballers
Expatriate footballers in Portugal
Expatriate footballers in Saudi Arabia
Cape Verdean expatriate sportspeople in Portugal
Cape Verdean expatriate sportspeople in Saudi Arabia